Boone Township is a township in Texas County, in the U.S. state of Missouri.

Boone Township was erected in 1845, taking its name from frontiersman Daniel Boone.

References

Townships in Missouri
Townships in Texas County, Missouri